Balkan Youth Championship was a competition held in the 1968-1981 period among youth team of Balkan countries: from 1968 to 1975 it was disputed among Under-23 teams, whereas, starting from 1976 until 1981, it was disputed among Under-21 football teams.

List of winners

Titles by nation

References

Balkans Cup
Defunct international association football competitions in Europe
Recurring sporting events established in 1968
Recurring sporting events disestablished in 1981